World Series of Fighting 19: Gaethje vs. Palomino was a mixed martial arts event held  in Phoenix, Arizona, United States. This event aired on NBCSN in the U.S and on Fight Network in Canada.

Background
The main event was for the WSOF Lightweight Championship as champion and Arizona native Justin Gaethje made the second defense of his title against challenger Luis Palomino.

Raymond Pina was originally scheduled to face Lucas Montoya in a lightweight bout, but unfortunately had to pull out of the fight a few days before the event due to an injury. 

This event was also scheduled to feature the first semifinal fight of the WSOF Light Heavyweight Championship tournament between Thiago Silva and Ronny Markes. But after Vinny Magalhães and Matt Hamill's fight was canceled due to Magalhães being removed from the tournament it was announced that Hamill and Silva would face off in the first semifinal fight of the WSOF Light Heavyweight Championship tournament. However, on the day of the event, Hamill was removed from the fight due to illness and was replaced by Teddy Holder.  Holder's original opponent, Jake Heun, remained on the card and fought Clifford Starks.  Starks' original opponent, Eddie Arizmendi, was removed from the card entirely, but paid his show and win money.

Results

Tournament bracket

See also 
 World Series of Fighting
 List of WSOF champions
 List of WSOF events

References

Events in Phoenix, Arizona
World Series of Fighting events
2015 in mixed martial arts